Department of Rural Roads (DRR) is a department of the Thai government, under the Ministry of Transport.  It maintains rural roads, under a different numbering scheme from national roads, which are managed by the Department of Highways (DOH), กรมทางหลวง, Krom Thang Luang).

Definition
The 1992 Highway Act, revised as the 2006 Highway Act, defines five highway types.

A rural highway or rural road is a highway which the Department of Rural Roads constructs and maintains. Registration of rural highways is overseen by the director general of the DRR.

Road numbering 

Rural road signs are gold-on-blue, with a two-letter provincial designation prefixed to the road number. Depicted is YS4011, a rural road in Yasothon Province. The rural road network measures some 35,000 km, about 82% of which is paved.

References

External links
 DRR website (Thai only)

See also 
 Thai motorway network
 Road signs in Thailand

Roads in Thailand
Ministry of Transport (Thailand)
Government departments of Thailand